Bet'oul Eih is the third studio album by Arabic singer Myriam Fares, released on April 22, 2008.

Singles
The first single is "Moukana Wein". It is Myriam's first khaliji song.
Music video director: Yehya Saade
The second single is the album's hit "Mouch Ananiya".
Music video director: Leila Kanaan
The third single is "Iyyam El Chitti".
Music video director:Wissam Smaira
The fourth single is "Betrouh".
Music video director:Wissam Smaira
The fifth single is "Eih Yalli Byohsal".
Music video director:Yehya Saade

Track listing
Mouch Ananiya
Eih Yalli Byohsal 
Enta Bet2ol Eih 
Betrouh 
Iyyam el Chitti
Ana Albi Lik 
Ala Khwana 
Law Konte Radi
Moukana Wein

Charts

References

Arabic-language albums
2008 albums
Myriam Fares albums